John Keppock (died 1404) was an Irish judge of the late fourteenth century, who held the offices of Lord Chief Justice of Ireland and Chief Baron of the Irish Exchequer. He became a political figure of some importance.

He was the son of Simon Keppock of Drumcashel, County Louth. The Keppock (or Cappock) family settled in Louth shortly after the Norman Conquest of Ireland and were closely associated with the town of Ardee. The John Keppock of Ardee who died in 1412, and was a leading figure in that town's government, as well as serving as High Sheriff of Louth, and Roger Keppock, a merchant who was living in Ardee in 1414, were probably cousins of the judge.

Keppock was living in England in 1352 and acted there as counsel for the powerful Anglo-Irish Cusack family. He returned to Ireland a few years later, and in 1356 he was appointed King's Serjeant in Ireland. In 1364 he became Lord Chief Baron of the Irish Exchequer, and in 1367 he was appointed Lord Chief Justice "ad placitum", i.e at the pleasure of the King. In 1370 he stood down as Lord Chief Justice in favour of William de Skipwith, but remained an ordinary judge of the Bench, as the Court of King's Bench was then generally known. We have a record of the two judges sitting together on assize in Kilkenny, and hearing an inheritance suit brought by Philip Overy. In 1372 he was reappointed Lord Chief Justice, and he acted as deputy to William  Tany, the Lord Chancellor of Ireland, (without the Great Seal of Ireland) in holding assizes in Waterford, in 1375, as Tany was too occupied with the King's business in Leinster. His deputyship continued when Tany went to England to report on the state of Irish affairs. In 1381 it was agreed that he should be paid £30 a year above his normal salary. In 1382 he once more stood down as Chief Justice to become an ordinary judge of the Bench. He received an extra payment for his expenses while on assizes.

In 1373–4, together with two judicial colleagues, Walter Cotterell and William de Karlell, he conducted a lengthy inquiry into the English Crown's right to treasure trove in County Wexford and County Waterford, which seems to have been expanded into a general inquiry into the Crown's prerogative rights in those two counties. The judges were also granted the power to arrest ships. In 1374 Keppock was appointed to hear complaints from the citizens of Drogheda concerning the importation of corn. 

From 1377 onwards he was regularly summoned to sit in the Parliament of Ireland, evidence of his growing political standing. In December 1381, when Edmund Mortimer, 3rd Earl of March, the Lord Lieutenant of Ireland, was killed in a skirmish in County Cork, Keppock was one of the senior judges who summoned the temporal and spiritual peers to inform them of the Earl's death, and requested them to choose a Lord Deputy to take his place. In the same year it was agreed that he be paid an extra £30 a year above his normal salary. He was presumably the "John Keppagh" who was one of two judges appointed to try a case of novel disseisin in 1401.

Keppock married, sometime after 1358, the twice-widowed Matilda Gernoun; her first husband had been William de Nottingham, son of Robert de Nottingham, who was several times Lord Mayor of Dublin, and her second husband was John Gernoun, Chief Justice of the Irish Common Pleas. Keppock and Matilda are not known to have had any children. He died in 1404.

References

People from Ardee
1404 deaths
Year of birth unknown
Lords chief justice of Ireland
Chief Barons of the Irish Exchequer
Serjeants-at-law (Ireland)